is an athletic stadium in Tsuyama, Okayama, Japan.

It was one of the home stadiums of football club Fagiano Okayama.

References

External links
Fagiano Okayama

Athletics (track and field) venues in Japan
Sports venues in Okayama Prefecture
Football venues in Japan
Tsuyama
Fagiano Okayama
1994 establishments in Japan
Sports venues completed in 1994